The 1983–84 NBA season was the Kings 35th season in the NBA, their 12th, and penultimate season in  Kansas City (their ninth playing full-time in Kansas City).

Draft picks

Roster

Regular season

Season standings

z – clinched division title
y – clinched division title
x – clinched playoff spot

Record vs. opponents

Game log

Regular season

|- align="center" bgcolor="#ffcccc"
| 1
| October 28, 1983
| Los Angeles
| L 107–117
|
|
|
| Kemper Arena
| 0–1
|- align="center" bgcolor="#ffcccc"
| 2
| October 30, 1983
| Seattle
| L 116–121
|
|
|
| Kemper Arena
| 0–2

|- align="center" bgcolor="#ffcccc"
| 4
| November 3, 1983
| Denver
| L 128–131
|
|
|
| Kemper Arena
| 1–3
|- align="center" bgcolor="#ffcccc"
| 7
| November 9, 1983
| @ Milwaukee
| L 93–95
|
|
|
| MECCA Arena
| 2–5
|- align="center" bgcolor="#ffcccc"
| 8
| November 11, 1983
| @ Philadelphia
| L 100–108
|
|
|
| The Spectrum
| 2–6
|- align="center" bgcolor="#ffcccc"
| 9
| November 12, 1983
| @ Detroit
| L 106–131
|
|
|
| Pontiac Silverdome
| 2–7
|- align="center" bgcolor="#ccffcc"
| 10
| November 15, 1983
| @ Washington
| W 101–100
|
|
|
| Capital Centre
| 3–7
|- align="center" bgcolor="#ffcccc"
| 13
| November 25, 1983
| @ Dallas
| L 96–98
|
|
|
| Reunion Arena
| 5–8
|- align="center" bgcolor="#ccffcc"
| 14
| November 26, 1983
| Utah
| W 117–116
|
|
|
| Kemper Arena
| 6–8
|- align="center" bgcolor="#ccffcc"
| 15
| November 28, 1983
| Portland
| W 113–104
|
|
|
| Kemper Arena
| 7–8
|- align="center" bgcolor="#ccffcc"
| 16
| November 30, 1983
| @ Phoenix
| W 120–118
|
|
|
| Arizona Veterans Memorial Coliseum
| 8–8

|- align="center" bgcolor="#ffcccc"
| 18
| December 3, 1983
| @ Utah
| L 107–112
|
|
|
| Salt Palace Acord Arena
| 8–10
|- align="center" bgcolor="#ccffcc"
| 19
| December 6, 1983
| Dallas
| W 112–103
|
|
|
| Kemper Arena
| 9–10
|- align="center" bgcolor="#ffcccc"
| 20
| December 8, 1983
| @ Los Angeles
| L 106–129
|
|
|
| The Forum
| 9–11
|- align="center" bgcolor="#ccffcc"
| 22
| December 14, 1983
| @ Seattle
| W 105–99
|
|
|
| Kingdome
| 11–11
|- align="center" bgcolor="#ffcccc"
| 24
| December 17, 1983
| @ Phoenix
| L 99–119
|
|
|
| Arizona Veterans Memorial Coliseum
| 11–13
|- align="center" bgcolor="#ccffcc"
| 25
| December 20, 1983
| Denver
| W 131–114
|
|
|
| Kemper Arena
| 12–13
|- align="center" bgcolor="#ffcccc"
| 27
| December 27, 1983
| Philadelphia
| L 109–112
|
|
|
| Kemper Arena
| 13–14

|- align="center" bgcolor="#ffcccc"
| 30
| January 3, 1984
| @ Portland
| L 104–123
|
|
|
| Memorial Coliseum
| 13–17
|- align="center" bgcolor="#ffcccc"
| 32
| January 6, 1984
| @ Utah
| L 110–130
|
|
|
| Salt Palace Acord Arena
| 14–18
|- align="center" bgcolor="#ccffcc"
| 33
| January 7, 1984
| Phoenix
| W 100–98
|
|
|
| Kemper Arena
| 14–19
|- align="center" bgcolor="#ccffcc"
| 34
| January 10, 1984
| Dallas
| W 112–102
|
|
|
| Kemper Arena
| 15–19
|- align="center" bgcolor="#ffcccc"
| 35
| January 12, 1984
| Los Angeles
| L 89–95
|
|
|
| Kemper Arena
| 15–20
|- align="center" bgcolor="#ffcccc"
| 38
| January 17, 1984
| Boston
| L 113–122
|
|
|
| Kemper Arena
| 16–22
|- align="center" bgcolor="#ffcccc"
| 39
| January 20, 1984
| @ Denver
| L 114–116
|
|
|
| McNichols Sports Arena
| 16–23
|- align="center" bgcolor="#ffcccc"
| 40
| January 21, 1984
| @ Portland
| L 94–114
|
|
|
| Memorial Coliseum
| 16–24
|- align="center" bgcolor="#ccffcc"
| 41
| January 24, 1984
| New Jersey
| W 113–104
|
|
|
| Kemper Arena
| 17–24
|- align="center" bgcolor="#ffcccc"
| 42
| January 26, 1984
| Seattle
| L 106–114
|
|
|
| Kemper Arena
| 17–25
|- align="center"
|colspan="9" bgcolor="#bbcaff"|All-Star Break
|- style="background:#cfc;"
|- bgcolor="#bbffbb"

|- align="center" bgcolor="#ffcccc"
| 44
| February 1, 1984
| @ Boston
| L 110–119
|
|
|
| Boston Garden
| 17–27
|- align="center" bgcolor="#ccffcc"
| 45
| February 3, 1984
| @ New Jersey
| W 113–104
|
|
|
| Brendan Byrne Arena
| 18–27
|- align="center" bgcolor="#ccffcc"
| 46
| February 4, 1984
| Denver
| W 107–100
|
|
|
| Kemper Arena
| 19–27
|- align="center" bgcolor="#ffcccc"
| 47
| February 7, 1984
| Milwaukee
| L 110–112 (OT)
|
|
|
| Kemper Arena
| 19–28
|- align="center" bgcolor="#ffcccc"
| 49
| February 10, 1984
| @ Dallas
| L 96–115
|
|
|
| Reunion Arena
| 20–29
|- align="center" bgcolor="#ccffcc"
| 50
| February 11, 1984
| Washington
| W 94–91
|
|
|
| Kemper Arena
| 21–29
|- align="center" bgcolor="#ffcccc"
| 51
| February 14, 1984
| New York
| L 100–106
|
|
|
| Kemper Arena
| 21–30
|- align="center" bgcolor="#ccffcc"
| 52
| February 16, 1984
| Utah
| W 121–99
|
|
|
| Kemper Arena
| 22–30
|- align="center" bgcolor="#ccffcc"
| 53
| February 18, 1984
| Atlanta
| W 111–106
|
|
|
| Kemper Arena
| 23–30
|- align="center" bgcolor="#ccffcc"
| 54
| February 21, 1984
| Detroit
| W 119–112
|
|
|
| Kemper Arena
| 24–30
|- align="center" bgcolor="#ffcccc"
| 55
| February 23, 1984
| Phoenix
| L 95–107
|
|
|
| Kemper Arena
| 24–31
|- align="center" bgcolor="#ffcccc"
| 56
| February 25, 1984
| @ Denver
| L 136–148
|
|
|
| McNichols Sports Arena
| 24–32

|- align="center" bgcolor="#ffcccc"
| 59
| March 2, 1984
| @ Dallas
| L 94–108
|
|
|
| Reunion Arena
| 26–33
|- align="center" bgcolor="#ccffcc"
| 60
| March 3, 1984
| Dallas
| W 105–103
|
|
|
| Kemper Arena
| 27–33
|- align="center" bgcolor="#ccffcc"
| 61
| March 6, 1984
| Portland
| W 128–110
|
|
|
| Kemper Arena
| 28–33
|- align="center" bgcolor="#ccffcc"
| 64
| March 14, 1984
| @ Atlanta
| W 101–93
|
|
|
| The Omni
| 30–34
|- align="center" bgcolor="#ffcccc"
| 66
| March 17, 1984
| @ New York
| L 109–123
|
|
|
| Madison Square Garden
| 31–35
|- align="center" bgcolor="#ffcccc"
| 69
| March 21, 1984
| Los Angeles
| L 116–123
|
|
|
| Kemper Arena
| 33–36
|- align="center" bgcolor="#ffcccc"
| 70
| March 23, 1984
| @ Denver
| L 116–126
|
|
|
| McNichols Sports Arena
| 33–37
|- align="center" bgcolor="#ffcccc"
| 72
| March 27, 1984
| @ Utah
| L 106–110
|
|
|
| Salt Palace Acord Arena
| 34–38
|- align="center" bgcolor="#ffcccc"
| 73
| March 28, 1984
| @ Seattle
| L 94–111
|
|
|
| Kingdome
| 34–39
|- align="center" bgcolor="#ffcccc"
| 74
| March 29, 1984
| @ Portland
| L 113–120
|
|
|
| Memorial Coliseum
| 34–40
|- align="center" bgcolor="#ccffcc"
| 75
| March 31, 1984
| Utah
| W 105–103
|
|
|
| Kemper Arena
| 35–40

|- align="center" bgcolor="#ffcccc"
| 76
| April 3, 1984
| @ Phoenix
| L 109–113
|
|
|
| Arizona Veterans Memorial Coliseum
| 35–41
|- align="center" bgcolor="#ffcccc"
| 78
| April 6, 1984
| @ Los Angeles
| L 97–112
|
|
|
| The Forum
| 36–42
|- align="center" bgcolor="#ffcccc"
| 80
| April 10, 1984
| Seattle
| L 113–125
|
|
|
| Kemper Arena
| 36–44

Playoffs

|- align="center" bgcolor="#ffcccc"
| 1
| April 18, 1984
| @ Los Angeles
| L 105–116
| Eddie Johnson (25)
| LaSalle Thompson (7)
| Larry Drew (7)
| The Forum13,918
| 0–1
|- align="center" bgcolor="#ffcccc"
| 2
| April 20, 1984
| @ Los Angeles
| L 102–109
| LaSalle Thompson (23)
| LaSalle Thompson (14)
| Reggie Theus (6)
| The Forum14,986
| 0–2
|- align="center" bgcolor="#ffcccc"
| 3
| April 22, 1984
| Los Angeles
| L 102–108
| Theus, Woodson (22)
| Larry Micheaux (10)
| Reggie Theus (7)
| Kemper Arena7,261
| 0–3
|-

Player statistics

Season

Playoffs

Awards and records

Transactions

References

See also
 1983–84 NBA season

Sacramento Kings seasons
Kansas
Kansas City Kings
Kansas City Kings